The 1903 South Meath by-election was a by-election held on 9 October 1903 for the British House of Commons constituency of South Meath.

The by-election was triggered by the death of the Independent Nationalist Member of Parliament (MP) James Laurence Carew.

The Irish Parliamentary Party nominated David Sheehy, a former member for Galway South, as its candidate. The former member for this constituency, John Howard Parnell, had lost to Carew in the previous general election due to an oversight which led to Carew being elected unopposed. Parnell was nominated as an Independent Nationalist. Sheehy was elected with more than twice the votes of Parnell.

Votes

References 

 The Times, 12 October 1903

See also 
 List of United Kingdom by-elections
 South Meath constituency

By-elections to the Parliament of the United Kingdom in County Meath constituencies
1903 elections in the United Kingdom
1903 elections in Ireland